Petar Krstić (born 3 September 1997) is a Macedonian football midfielder of Serbian descent, who plays for FK Radan Lebane.

Club career

Radnički Niš
Born in Leskovac, Krstić was with Radan Lebane and Sloga Leskovac, before he joined Radnički Niš in summer 2015. He made his Serbian SuperLiga in the 13 fixture of the 2015–16 season against Spartak Subotica, played on 14 October 2015. During the season, he made 11 league caps and a quarter-final cup match against Partizan, played on 2 March 2016.

Career statistics

Club

References

External links
 Petar Krstić stats at utakmica.rs 
 
 

1997 births
Living people
Sportspeople from Leskovac
Macedonian people of Serbian descent
Association football midfielders
Macedonian footballers
North Macedonia youth international footballers
North Macedonia under-21 international footballers
FK Radnički Niš players
Serbian SuperLiga players
Macedonian expatriate footballers
Expatriate footballers in Serbia
Macedonian expatriate sportspeople in Serbia